, also known by the abbreviations  and SAS, are a Japanese rock band that first formed in 1974.

The band is composed of Keisuke Kuwata (lead vocals and guitars), Yuko Hara (vocals and keyboards), Kazuyuki Sekiguchi (bass), Hiroshi Matsuda (drums) and Hideyuki "Kegani" Nozawa (percussion). In addition to the present lineup, former guitarist Takashi Omori had worked in the band until 2001.

After the contract with Victor Entertainment, the band released their top-ten charting debut single "Katte ni Sindbad" in 1978. Since then, Southern has been one of the best-selling music groups in the past 30 years of Japan, selling more than 47 million albums and singles in Japan alone. They have had over 40 top-ten hit singles and 16 number-one albums on the Japan's Oricon Charts as of 2008.

Their 1998 compilation Umi no Yeah!! has sold more than 3.3 million copies and became the best-selling double album in Japanese history. Their most commercially successful song "Tsunami", released in 2000, has sold over 2.9 million units in Japan alone, and provided the band with honor of winning the 42nd Japan Record Awards. The band was also acclaimed and ranked number one in HMV Japan's 2003 list of "100 most influential Japanese musicians". In 2007, Rolling Stone Japan ranked their album Ninkimono de Ikō number 32 on a list of the greatest Japanese rock albums of all time. They are also the only group to ever have 44 songs on the Oricon Top 100 weekly single chart simultaneously.

The band has occasionally gone into hiatus while individual members worked on solo and other projects, and did so again between 2008 and 2013.

History

Early years
In 1974, a prototype of the band, composed of Aoyama Gakuin University students who belonged to the popular music club "Better Days", was formed by Keisuke Kuwata. In their early days, the band changed its name frequently, such as "Onsen Anma Momohiki Band", "Piston Kuwata and the Cylinders", and "Keisuke Kuwata and the Hitchcock Gekijou". Finally, when keyboardist Yuko Hara joined the group, they chose a permanent name. Named after the "Fania All-Stars" and "Southern rock" by Kuwata's friend.

After several changes of members, they tried for "Yamaha EastWest '77", the contest of amateur musicians by the Yamaha Music Foundation. At this contest, Kuwata won a prize for the "best vocalist". When the band participated in this contest, Hiroshi Matsuda and Hideyuki Nozawa, two members who were not Aoyama Gakuin's students joined them, and all the members of the group were then assembled.

On June 25, 1978, their debut single "Katte ni Sindbad" was released from Victor Entertainment. Its title was named after two hit songs in Japan in 1977, "Katte ni Shiyagare" by Kenji Sawada and "Nagisa no Sindbad" by Pink Lady In addition, the release date of their debut single was Sawada's 29th birthday.  The song featured Kuwata's impressive coarse-grained vocals like a tongue twister. To promote their first single, they appeared on various TV programs. The weird costumes they dressed in and their eccentric performance made an unforgettable impact on listeners. Their single gradually climbed the charts, and peaked at number-three on the Japan's oricon singles chart in autumn of the same year.

Because of the sales promotion of "Katte ni Sindbad" and a following single "Kibun Shidai de Semenaide", they were considered performers of novelty songs. However, "Itoshi no Ellie", their third single released on March 25, 1979, was sufficient to overturn their comedic public image. This pop-ballad was highly regarded by many Japanese music critics and artists, including Hiroshi Miyagawa and Kosetsu Minami. The song is regarded as one of the most notable songs by the Southern All Stars. In 1988, a cover version by Ray Charles was featured in a Suntory Limited TV advertisement. It was released as a single in Japan only, and reached number-three on the Oricon. The cover version by Charles became the best-selling single performed by a Western artist in 1989.

Two months after Southern released their debut single, their first album called Atsui Munasawagi was marketed. The band was not able to devote ample time to recording and songwriting for 10 Numbers Carat, their second album which featured their breakthrough ballad "Itoshi no Ellie", which was released only eight months after their debut album. Kuwata's angry look on the album cover mirrored his exhaustion. Hence, the leader of the band wasn't satisfied with the quality of the album, and has stated that the album was "trash".

The first half of the 1980s
In 1980, the band started a serial project called "Five Rock Show", and released five singles every month. Due to a lack of sales promotion, each single succeeded only moderately. However, thanks to the success of their early singles in the late '70s, they had built up a solid fan base and high popularity on the album chart in Japan. Since Tiny Bubbles, their third album released in 1980, all of their studio albums have reached the top consecutively. That album featured two songs featuring vocals by band members, Yuko Hara's "Watashi wa Piano" and Matsuda's "Matsuda no Komoriuta". The former was covered by girl-pop singer Mizue Takada in the same year, and became a top-ten hit.

On January 24, 1982, the band released the single "Chako no Kaigan Monogatari". Kuwata wanted a commercial hit, and wrote this one more in the typical Japanese kayōkyoku style. In addition, as a vocalist, he imitated the lisping vocals of Toshihiko Tahara, one of the most popular Japanese male idol singers at that time. Such popular expression generally received favorable reaction from the public, and became the band's most successful single since Itoshi no Ellie. Following the success of the single, their fifth studio album Nude Man was bigger than ever. The album reached number-three on Oricon's 1982 year-end chart, and later became that year's best-selling album. One of the highlights of Nude Man, Natsu o Akiramete was recorded by distinguished comedian and singer Naoko Ken the same year. Her cover version sold 300,000 copies, and became one of her most successful works as a singer.

After the hit of "Chako no Kaigan Monogatari", Kuwata married Hara on his 26th birthday. They invited their fans for their wedding ceremony.

Throughout Southern's career, Kuwata has featured extremely erotic expressions in many of his self-written songs and the band's sales promotions. "I Love You wa Hitorigoto", Kuwata composition released as Hara's first solo single in 1981, was banned due to suggestive lyrics including the term "motel". The cover of the band's 1983 single "Body Special II" featured the breast of a topless woman. Such explicit expression from Kuwata and his band's music has continued to date.

In 1983 and 1984, two albums Kirei and Ninkimono de Ikō were released. Both of these albums featured mainly adult-oriented rock rendition songs. With Miss Brand-New Day, a successful single and one of the highlights on Ninkimono de Ikō, the band gradually built up a definite reputation in the changeable Japanese music industry.

In 1985, the band released double studio album Kamakura, which is now considered one of their best albums. To promote this blockbuster, extensive advertisement including an impressive TV commercial starring distinguished comedian Sanma Akashiya was used. Such large-scale promotion brought about rumors that the band might break up. In fact, in the process of recording, conflict arose between the Kuwata and Sekiguchi. It is said that they devoted over 1,800 hours to the recording of this album. The process did not always go smoothly, but the end product proved overwhelmingly successful. The album was highly praised by critics and listeners alike, and Kuwata was very satisfied with the favorable reception. In addition, Hara conceived his child the same year, so he suspended the group's career temporarily. Around 1986, he began work on solo projects, including the Kuwata Band. Other band members also began various solo projects.

Projects with Takeshi Kobayashi
"Kanashii Kimochi (Just a Man in Love)", Keisuke Kuwata's successful solo debut single released in 1987, was produced and arranged by Takeshi Kobayashi. Kobayashi started his career in the late '70s, and collaborated with numerous Japanese musicians, including Ryuichi Sakamoto, Yosui Inoue, Taeko Onuki, Hiroshi Takano and Kenji Omori. Through the recording of the solo material, Kuwata recognized Kobayashi's abundant and practical ability, and decided to continue this strong combination for his career. In the late 1980s and the early 1990s, Kobayashi participated in many projects with Southern. Kuwata praised Kobayashi's capability as a partner, and joked at a live performance, "Even if he is unwilling to be part of my projects, I'll force him to be involved in my career!"

On June 25, 1988, ten years after Southern debuted, they returned to the Japanese music scene with a single "Minna no Uta" produced by Kobayashi. Their 1989 single Sayonara Baby reached to the top on the oricon's single chart, and it became the first No. 1 hit on that chart for the band. In same year, 4-CDs box-set compilation entitled Suika was released. Regardless of its size/price, the album reached No. 1 and sold more than 300,000 units.

1990s
In the 1990s, the Japanese music industry prospered more than during other decades. Southern continued to enjoy commercial success, and remained one of the mainstream groups of Japanese popular music throughout the 1990s.

In 1990, Kuwata directed the film called Inamura Jane. The movie was not well-received, but the soundtrack was very successful, reaching No. 1 on Japanese chart and selling over 1 million copies, eventually becoming the best selling Japanese soundtrack album of all time. "Manatsu no Kajitsu", a song written by Kuwata was released as the lead single from the album, and climbed to the top 5 on the charts. In 1991, Hong Kong singer Jacky Cheung covered the ballad in Chinese, and enjoyed huge commercial success in several Asian countries.  Dozens of other cover versions followed, from Asia to Europe; one of these is a Tagalog-language version sung by Donna Cruz, entitled "Isang Tanong, Isang Sagot", released in 1997.

The soundtrack also included another highlight, "Kibō no Wadachi". Having appeared on the album only, the song is well known as one of the Southern All Stars' most significant songs.

Kuwata and his band also released a self-titled studio album in 1990. Following the previous O.S.T. album, it became million-seller.

In 1991, Kazuyuki Sekiguchi left the band temporarily to overcome health problems, not returning until 1995. The next year, 1992, the remaining members released two singles "Shulaba-La-Bamba" and "Namida no Kiss" simultaneously.  The latter marked the top of the Oricon singles chart for 7 weeks and sold more than 1.5 million copies. It was their first million-selling single, and finally marked the top five on the Japanese Year-End singles chart for 1992. Two months from the release of those successful singles, their tenth studio album entitled Yo ni Man'yō no Hana ga Sakunari was released. At first, Kuwata planned to release it as a double album, but finally decided to omit some of the recordings, including 1991 number-one hit single "Neo Bravo!!" The album has sold nearly 1.8 million copies.

In 1993, the remixed EP Enoshima was released under the pseudonym project named "Z-Dan". It sold more than 900,000 copies, and won the 8th Japan Gold Disc Award's "Compilation Album of the Year" prize. The same year, the band released the second million-selling single "Erotica Seven". Strong partnership between Kuwata and Kobayashi ended in the band's holiday song released as a single "Christmas Love" in the autumn of that year. However, the two have collaborated from time to time after the temporary parting, such as Kuwata and Mr. Children's successful charity single "Kiseki no Hoshi" released in 1995.

Throughout 1994, Kuwata worked as a solo artist again, and Southern released no new material.  The next year the band restarted with "Mampy no G-Spot", an obscene song released as a single only. From this single, Sekiguchi, who had left the band in 1991, appeared again. "Anatadake o -Summer Heartbreak-", the other song released in 1995 provided the group with their 3rd million-seller single. Later, Kuwata mentioned that Summer Heartbreak is one of his favorites. The next year, the band released two singles Ai no Kotodama -Spiritual Message- and Taiyō wa Tsumi na Yatsu, the former selling over million copies. Young Love, their 11th album featured successful singles including two million-sellers, has sold more than 2.5 million copies to become one of the best-selling albums of 1996. It has remained the band's most successful studio album to date.

Tsunami and Omori's independence 
On January 26, 2000, their 44th single, "Tsunami" was released. It was used as theme song of Mirai Nikki III, a popular part of the TBS program called Un-nan no Hontoko!, and made a strong impression on many people. The song reached number-one on the singles chart for five weeks, finally selling more than 2.9 million units. It is the third best-selling single in Japan of the last 40 years.  On New Year's Eve of 2000, Tsunami won the 42nd Japan Record Awards. After the enormous success of the single, the band became more conservative. They now release fewer singles and all of them have become hits.

After the concert tour in 2000, Takashi Omori announced a stop in work and he left from the band in August 2001. Omori and his wife were well known as pious and influential Soka Gakkai adherents. This caused various rumors in the press about religious problems between himself and other members and many fans.

By the early 2000s, each member had actively pursued solo projects. Particularly, Kuwata produced three million-selling records and one album around 2001 and 2002.

Recent years
In October 2005, their latest double-album Killer Street was released. The album debuted at number-one on both the national and the Worldwide Charts, and has sold over a million units to date.

Awards

Discography

Number one singles
The following songs reached the top of Oricon weekly singles chart:
"Sayonara Baby" (さよならベイビー Goodbye, Baby) (June 7, 1989)
"Neo Bravo!!" (ネオ・ブラボー!!) (July 10, 1991)
"Namida no Kiss" (涙のキッス Kiss of Tears) (July 18, 1992)
"Erotica Seven" (エロティカ・セブン EROTICA SEVEN) (July 21, 1993)
"Anata Dake o ~Summer Heartbreak~" (あなただけを ～Summer Heartbreak～ Only to You~Summer Heartbreak~) (July 17, 1995)
"Ai no Kotodama ~Spiritual Message~" (愛の言霊 ～Spiritual Message～ Kotodama of Love~Spiritual Messeage~) (May 20, 1996)
"Tsunami" (TSUNAMI) (January 26, 2000)
"Katte ni Sinbad" (勝手にシンドバッド Willfully, Sinbad) (June 25, 2003) (This is the second version. Original version, released in 1978, didn't reach the top.)
"Namida no Umi de Dakaretai ~Sea of Love~" (涙の海で抱かれたい ～Sea of Love～ I Want to be Held in the Sea of Tears ~Sea of Love~) (July 23, 2003)
"Aya ~Aja~" (彩 ～Aja～) (April 14, 2004)
"Kimi Koso Star da" (君こそスターだ You are the Star) (July 21, 2004)
"Ai to Yokubō no Hibi" (愛と欲望の日々 Days of Love and Desire) (November 24, 2004)
"Dirty Old Man ~Saraba Natsu Yo~" (DIRTY OLD MAN ～さらば夏よ～ Dirty Old Man ~Goodbye Summer~) (August 9, 2006)
"I am your singer"(I AM YOUR SINGER) (August 6, 2008)
"Peace to Hi-lite" (ピースとハイライト Peace & Hi-lite)(August 7, 2013)
"Tokyo Victory"(東京VICTORY Tokyo, Victory) (September 22, 2014)

Number one albums
The following albums reached the top of Oricon weekly albums chart:
 (1980)
 (1981)
Nude Man (1982)
 (compilation, 1982)
 (1983)
 (1984)
Kamakura (1985)
Ballade 2 '83–'86 (compilation, 1986)
 Southern All Stars Special 61 Songs (box-set compilation, 1989)
Southern All Stars (1990)
 (soundtrack for the same-titled film released as Southern All Stars and All Stars, 1990)
 (1992)
HAPPY! (box-set compilation, 1995)
Young Love (1996)
 (compilation, 1998)
 (1998)
 the album of LOVE' (compilation, 2000)
 (2005)
 (2015)

Video games
Space MOSA: Southern All Stars Space Museum of Southern Art (Sony PlayStation, December 10, 1999)

See also
List of best-selling music artists in Japan

References

External links
 
sas-fan.net Southern All Stars Portal Web Site 
Official site of the Southern All Stars' Fanclub  
BEAT CLUB (Official Site of Hiroshi Matsuda) 
Yunomi? (Official Site of Kazuyuki Sekiguchi) 
KEGANI-DREAM (Official Site of Hideyuki "Kegani" Nozawa) 
Nippop Profile | Southern All Stars
 

Musical groups established in 1978
Japanese rock music groups
1978 establishments in Japan
Musical groups from Kanagawa Prefecture
Musical quintets
Amuse Inc. artists